Changchun or Chang Chun may also refer to:

Name of Chinese places
Changchun is a city in Jilin, China.

Chinese towns
 Changchun, Yiyang (长春镇), a town of Ziyang District, Yiyang City, Hunan.

Other places
Changchun Temple, Buddhist temple in Beijing, China

Name of Chinese people
Qiu Chuji (1148–1227), or Changchun,  Chinese Daoist
Chang Ch'ün (1889–1990), Chinese politician
Li Changchun the Propaganda chief of the Communist Party of China

Other uses
7485 Changchun,  main-belt asteroid
Destroyer Changchun, the Soviet Destroyer Reshitelny in Chinese service